Athanasios 'Thanasis' Leonidopoulos (born 3 June 1996) is a Greek professional footballer who plays as a defensive midfielder for Super League 2 club Makedonikos.

References

1996 births
Living people
Greek footballers
Super League Greece 2 players
Gamma Ethniki players
Ethnikos Piraeus F.C. players
Platanias F.C. players
Asteras Vlachioti F.C. players
Makedonikos F.C. players
Association football midfielders
Footballers from Western Greece
People from Achaea